The Infant Welfare Society of Chicago promotes the welfare of infants in the Chicago area of the United States. It was established in 1911 by the staff and volunteers of the Chicago Milk Commission.

References

External links 
Official website

Public health organizations
Infant feeding
1911 establishments in Illinois

Human welfare organizations based in Chicago
Non-profit organizations based in Chicago